Primary or primaries may refer to:

Arts, entertainment, and media

Music

Groups and labels
 Primary (band), from Australia
 Primary (musician), hip hop musician and record producer from South Korea
 Primary Music, Israeli record label

Works
 Primary (album)  by Rubicon (2002)
 "Primary" (song) by The Cure
 "Primary", song by Spoon from the album Telephono

Other uses in arts, entertainment, and media
 Primaries or primary beams, in E. E. Smith's science-fiction series Lensman
 Primary (film), American political  documentary (1960)

Computing
 PRIMARY, an X Window selection
 Primary data storage, computer technology used to retain digital data
 Primary server, main server on the server farm

Education
 Primary education, the first stage of compulsory education
 Primary FRCA, academic examination for anaesthetists in the U.K.
 Primary school, school providing primary education

Mathematics
 p-group  of prime power order
 Primary decomposition into primary ideals
 Primary ideals,  concept in commutative algebra
 Primary number, positive integer power of a prime number

Politics
 Primary election,  election by which a political party selects and nominates a candidate
 Primary vote, the total of first-preference votes in the Australian electoral system

Science and mechanics
 Primary (astronomy), the larger of two co-orbiting bodies
 Primary (chemistry), term used in organic chemistry
 Primary, the oldest period in the Geologic time scale (obsolete)
 Primary, a stage in a thermonuclear explosive
 Primary circuit, electrical circuit in a transformer that receives current, as opposed to secondary circuit
 Primary field,  type of field in conformal field theory
 Primary mirror,  principal light-gathering surface of a reflecting telescope
 Primary power line, electric power transmission line fed to or from a transformer
 Primary feathers, flight feathers attached to the manus ("hand") in the wings of birds
 Primary color

Other uses
 Primary (LDS Church), a children's Sunday School organization
 Primary (musician) (born 1983), South Korean
 Primary data (or raw data), a term for data collected from a source
 Primary Flight Training, in the U.S. Navy
 Primary source, original materials
 Primary disease, a disease that is due to a root cause of illness

See also
 Binary (disambiguation)
 Primary group (disambiguation)
 Second (disambiguation)
 Unary (disambiguation)